The name Ingrid has been used to name two tropical cyclones in the Atlantic Ocean, one in the Western Pacific Ocean, one in the South-West Indian Ocean, and three in the Australian region.

In the Atlantic:
 Tropical Storm Ingrid (2007) – a short-lived tropical storm.
Hurricane Ingrid (2013) – A hurricane, devastated Mexico
After the 2013 season, the name Ingrid was retired; it was replaced by Imelda for the 2019 season

In the Western Pacific:
 Typhoon Ingrid (1946) – struck the Philippines and China.

In the South-West Indian:
 Tropical Cyclone Ingrid (1964)
 Cyclone Ingrid (1995)

In the Australian region:
 Cyclone Ingrid (1970)
 Cyclone Ingrid (1984)
 Cyclone Ingrid (2005) – a powerful system that caused 5 deaths in Queensland and Northern Territory.
After the 2004-05 season, the name Ingrid was removed from the Australian name list.

Atlantic hurricane set index articles
Pacific typhoon set index articles
South-West Indian Ocean cyclone set index articles
Australian region cyclone set index articles